Crosby was a constituency in Merseyside, represented in the House of Commons of the Parliament of the United Kingdom from 1950 until 2010. It elected one Member of Parliament (MP) by the first past the post system of election.

History
Prior to 1997, the constituency was seen as a safe seat for the Conservative Party.  They held the seat from its creation in 1950 until the death in 1981 of Sir Graham Page.  The resulting by-election was notable as it was won by Shirley Williams, one of the "gang of four" senior members of the Labour Party who had founded the new Social Democratic Party (SDP), becoming the first SDP member to be elected.  However, Williams lost the seat to the Conservative candidate Malcolm Thornton at the 1983 general election.

Thornton held the seat until the 1997 election, when he lost to Labour's Claire Curtis-Thomas who held the seat until its abolition. On 7 October 2009, it was announced that Curtis-Thomas would stand down at the 2010 general election.

Boundaries

1950–1955: The Borough of Crosby, and the parish of Ford in the Rural District of West Lancashire.

1955–1974: The Borough of Crosby, and the Urban District of Litherland.

1974–1983: The Borough of Crosby, the Urban District of Formby, and in the Rural District of West Lancashire the parishes of Altcar, Ince Blundell, Maghull, Sefton (part), and Thornton.

1983–1997: The Metropolitan Borough of Sefton wards of Blundellsands, Harington, Manor, Molyneux, Park, Ravenmeols, Sudell, and Victoria.

1997–2010: The Metropolitan Borough of Sefton wards of Blundellsands, Church, Harington, Manor, Ravenmeols, and Victoria.

The predecessor seat to Crosby was the Waterloo constituency, which existed between 1918 and 1950. Crosby constituency covered the whole town of Crosby which includes the localities of Great Crosby, Blundellsands, Brighton-le-Sands, Seaforth, Waterloo, Little Crosby, Hightown and Thornton, as well as the town of Formby and the village of Little Altcar, all in Sefton in Merseyside. On its abolition in 2010 it was bordered to the north by the constituency of Southport, to the east by Lancashire West and Knowsley North and Sefton East, and to the south by Bootle.

Following a review by the Boundary Commission for England, the Crosby constituency was abolished at the 2010 general election. It was replaced by the new Sefton Central seat, which includes parts of the former Knowsley North and Sefton East constituency. As a result, Formby and Little Altcar are part of the new Sefton Central constituency and the town of Crosby has been divided between two constituencies, with the two electoral wards of southern Crosby, Church and Victoria, containing the urbanised bulk of the town which includes the areas of Great Crosby, Waterloo and Seaforth, being absorbed into the expanded Bootle constituency, represented by the Labour MP Joe Benton, and the two electoral wards of northern Crosby, Blundellsands and Manor, which contains residential suburban areas such as, Blundellsands, Brighton-Le-Sands, Little Crosby, Thornton, and Hightown, forming part of the new Sefton Central constituency represented by Bill Esterson, also a Labour MP.

Members of Parliament

Elections

Elections in the 1950s

Elections in the 1960s

Elections in the 1970s

Elections in the 1980s

Elections in the 1990s

Elections in the 2000s

See also
 List of parliamentary constituencies in Merseyside

Notes and references

Parliamentary constituencies in North West England (historic)
Constituencies of the Parliament of the United Kingdom established in 1950
Constituencies of the Parliament of the United Kingdom disestablished in 2010
Politics of the Metropolitan Borough of Sefton
Crosby, Merseyside